Jerome Drayton (born January 10, 1945 in Kolbermoor, Bavaria, Germany) is a former long-distance runner who competed internationally for Canada. He was born as Peter Buniak in Germany, and came to Canada in the mid-1950s when his mother moved there after divorcing his father. He reportedly based his new name on two famous sprinters he admired: Canadian former world record holder Harry Jerome and American Paul Drayton, former world record holder in the 4 × 100 m as part of the American relay team.  However, Drayton has denied this, stating that he chose Jerome because it was a name he had always liked, and Drayton because he thought the two names fit well together. A prominent runner in the 1970s, when he was for a time ranked as the top marathoner in the world, he won the Fukuoka Marathon in 1969, 1975, and 1976, as well as the Boston Marathon in 1977. His Canadian men's national record time in the marathon of 2:10:09, set in 1975 at the Fukuoka Marathon, stood for 43 years until broken by Cam Levins in October 2018 with a time of 2:09:25 in the Toronto Waterfront Marathon. Drayton had held the Canadian record since 1969, after breaking the then record of 2:18:55 set by Robert Moore a month earlier.

History
Drayton was born as Peter Buniak on January 10, 1945, in Munich, Germany, to parents of Russian-Ukrainian background. Having been born as the Second World War was coming to an end and extreme poverty was widespread, Drayton and his parents had traveled to Germany from Poland aboard a cattle train. Drayton’s parents eventually divorced and his mother, who had custody of him, moved to Canada and then brought Drayton over to Toronto in November, 1956, when he was 11 years old. When he took up running in high school, Drayton’s single-mindedness quickly became evident and it wasn’t long before he won top-calibre events. After winning the Ontario high school championships for Mimico High School, he was recruited to the Toronto Olympic Club, where he began working with national distance running coach Paul Poce.

Achievements

See also
 Canadian records in track and field
 List of winners of the Boston Marathon

References

External links
 A history of the Fukuoka International Marathon Championships
 Canadian Olympic Committee
 Collections Canada

1945 births
Living people
People from Kolbermoor
Sportspeople from Upper Bavaria
Canadian male long-distance runners
Canadian male marathon runners
Olympic male marathon runners
Olympic track and field athletes of Canada
Athletes (track and field) at the 1968 Summer Olympics
Athletes (track and field) at the 1976 Summer Olympics
Commonwealth Games silver medallists for Canada
Commonwealth Games medallists in athletics
Athletes (track and field) at the 1970 British Commonwealth Games
Athletes (track and field) at the 1974 British Commonwealth Games
Athletes (track and field) at the 1978 Commonwealth Games
Japan Championships in Athletics winners
Boston Marathon male winners
German emigrants to Canada
Medallists at the 1978 Commonwealth Games